Biclavula is a genus of diplurans in the family Projapygidae.

Species
 Biclavula wygodzinskyi San Martín, 1963

References

Diplura